Maha Aungmye District is the district of Mandalay Region, Myanmar. It is included under Mandalay City Development Committee and Mandalay. Its principal township is Maha Aungmye.

Townships

The townships, cities, towns that are included in Maha Aungmye District are as follows:
Maha Aungmye Township
Chanayethazan Township
Chanmyathazi Township
Pyigyidagun Township

History
On April 30, 2022, new districts were expanded and organized. Maha Aungmye, Chanayethazan, Chanmyathazi and Pyigyidagun Townships from Mandalay District were formed as Maha Aungmye District.

References

Districts of Myanmar
Mandalay Region